Seymour Remenick (1923 – December 15, 1999) was a Philadelphia-based artist and teacher, mostly known for landscapes, but who also painted a variety of other subjects.

Remenick studied at the Tyler School of Art  in Philadelphia, 1940-1942; the Hans Hofmann School in New York City, 1946-1948; and the Pennsylvania Academy Fine Arts (PAFA) in Philadelphia. He later taught at PAFA from 1977 to 1996.

Remenick's work was exhibited at a number of venues, including the Philadelphia Museum of Art, the Pennsylvania Academy of Fine Arts, the Philadelphia School of Painting, the Terenchin and the Davis Galleries. His paintings have also been auctioned at Christie's, New York. In 2010, the Lancaster Museum of Art held a posthumous exhibition of his works. His paintings were cataloged by the Smithsonian American Art Museum.

Among the awards he received were a 1955 Louis Comfort Tiffany Foundation Grant, the 1960 Altman Landscape Prize from the National Academy of Design (NAD), and a 1960 Hallmark Purchase Award. NAD elected Remenick an associate member in 1980, and an academician in 1982. As a teacher at PAFA, he served as mentor to Giovanni Casadei, Robert Dye and others.

Education and personal life 
Remenick was born in 1923 in Detroit, Michigan, and died in 1999 in Philadelphia. He married Diane K. Thommen (1931–2014) in 1950, and they had two children, Richard and Catherine.

References 

20th-century American painters
20th-century American male artists
1923 births
1999 deaths
Artists from Philadelphia
National Academy of Design members
Pennsylvania Academy of the Fine Arts alumni
Pennsylvania Academy of the Fine Arts faculty